Salik (Səlik) is a rural locality (a selo) in Derbentsky District, Republic of Dagestan, Russia. The population was 1,763 as of 2010. There are 16 streets.

Geography 
Salik is located 22 km northwest of Derbent (the district's administrative centre) by road. Velikent and Kala are the nearest rural localities.

Nationalities 
Tabasarans, Azerbaijanis and Dargins live there.

References 

Rural localities in Derbentsky District